Defence Equipment and Support (DE&S) is a trading entity and joint-defence organisation within the UK Ministry of Defence. It began operating on 2 April 2007, following the merger of the MoD's Defence Procurement Agency and the Defence Logistics Organisation, under the Chief Executive Officer of Defence Equipment and Support. 

DE&S initially had a civilian and military workforce of around 29,000 (77 per cent civilian and 23 per cent military) in the UK and abroad.  As of 2022 the DE&S workforce had reduced to around 11,500 with the majority based at MoD Abbey Wood in Bristol.

History

Defence Equipment and Support was established on 2 April 2007. It is overseen by the Minister of State for Defence Procurement. The organisation supports Strategic Command and the individual armed services through  Navy Command, Army Headquarters and Headquarters Air Command.

Strategic governance

Defence Equipment and Support Board
Includes:

Mark Russell became chairman in November 2019.

The Board provides strategic governance for DE&S and a robust forum for independent, non-executive support and constructive challenge to the Chief Executive and the Executive Committee. The DE&S Board delegates some activities to sub-committees of the Board, namely the Audit, Remuneration, Programme Review and Nomination Committees. The Chairman ensures that the Board receives feedback on these sub-Committees and that it is able to consider their recommendations.

Direction and oversight

Executive Committee Defence Equipment and Support
Includes:

DE&S is led on a day-to-day basis by the Executive Committee, which consists of the Chief Executive Officer, Director Finance, Director Human Resources, Director Strategy & Corporate Operations, and five Director Generals who lead the delivery of the programme of work in their respective domains.

Sub Committees
Includes: The following subordinate Committees provide specialised support to the Executive Committee.

Administration of DE&S and senior leadership
The organisation has been under the leadership of a civilian Chief Executive Officer of Defence Equipment and Support since 2015.

Chief Executive Officer of Defence Equipment and Support

Director General for Air/Army/Navy/Strategic Enablers/Commercial/Resources
The Chiefs of Materiel (CofMs), now Director Generals (DGs), are responsible for managing key relationships with the Capability Sponsor and User. They work at the strategic level to make sure that the operational readiness and sustainability needs of the User are met.

The DGs ensure an ethos of support to operations is in place to the User, throughout all DE&S activity.

Chief of Fleet Support

Director General (Ships)

Directorate of Ships Support

Directorate of Ships Acquisition

Chief of Materiel (Submarines)
This group now is part of the Submarine Delivery Agency.

Directorate of Submarine Acquisitions

Directorate of Submarines Support

Director General (Land)

Directorate of Land Equipment

Directorate of Weapons

Director General (Air)

Directorate of Air Support

Directorate of Combat Air

Director General Strategic Enablers

Directorate of Intelligence, Surveillance, Target, Acquisition & Reconnaissance

Directorate of Engineering & Safety

Directorate of Digital Information

Directorate of Programmes & Change

Directorate of Helicopters

Directorate of Support

Directorate-General (Commercial)

Commercial Operations

Commercial Capability

Commercial Improvements

Directorate-General (Resources)

Financial Planning & Analysis

Directorate Human Resources

Deputy Director HR Head of Function - HR

HR Operations

Performance & Reward

Talent & Organisation Development

HR (Strategic Enablers)

HR (Land)

HR (Air & Ships)

HR (Military Human Resources & Commanding Officer)

Directorate Strategy & Change

International Relations Group

Corporate Communications

COVID-19 Operations Cell

Major projects
DE&S manages over 600 defence procurement and support programmes for the UK's armed services.  Examples of current and future procurement projects include:

Ships
 Type 45 destroyer  class
  submarine class
  landing platform dock class
  landing ship dock class
  class
 Type 26 frigate warship class
 Type 31 frigate class
 
 
 Solid Support Ship
  submarine class
  – replacement class for the Vanguard class

Aircraft
Eurofighter Typhoon fighter aircraft
F-35 Joint Strike Fighter fighter aircraft
A400M transport aircraft
C-17 Globemaster III transport aircraft
Lockheed C-130 Hercules transport aircraft
Future Strategic Tanker Aircraft (FSTA)/Airbus A330 MRTT aerial refueling tanker
Apache MkI attack helicopter
Merlin HC4 support and Merlin Mk2 anti-submarine warfare helicopters
Hawk 128 advanced jet trainer
Watchkeeper Unmanned Aerial Vehicle
Sentinel R1
Beechcraft Shadow R1
Airseeker
Protector UAV
 Boeing P-8A Poseidon MRA Mk1

Vehicles
Warrior and Warrior Warrior Capability Sustainment Programme
Challenger 2 and Challenger Challenger 2 Life Extension Programme
 Mastiff Cougar (MRAP) Protected Patrol Vehicle
Ajax (Scout SV)
Panther Command and Liaison Vehicle
Jackal
Viking armoured personnel carrier
Mechanised Infantry Vehicle, ie Boxer
Multi Role Vehicle-Protected (MRV-P) (MRV-P)

Munitions
AIM-132 ASRAAM (air-to-air missile)
Meteor air-to-air missile
Storm Shadow cruise missile
Brimstone air-launched anti-tank guided missile
FGM-148 Javelin anti-tank guided missile
NLAW (MBT LAW) anti-tank missile
 SPEAR, Selective Precision Effects At Range munitions; see, for example, SPEAR 3

Other
Future Integrated Soldier Technology modular infantry equipment system
Bowman tactical communications system
Skynet 5 strategic communications satellite system
Light weapons, photography and batteries (LWPB)

Main locations
As of 2016 the main locations (with staff numbers) were:
 MoD Abbey Wood (7,920) - Head Office
 DM Beith (220) - Defence Munitions
 MoD Bicester (140) - Logistics
 HMNB Clyde (100) - Fleet Support and Defence Munitions
 HMNB Devonport (220) - Fleet Support and Defence Munitions
 DM Kineton (240) - Defence Munitions
 DM Longtown (120) - Defence Munitions
 Ministry of Defence, London (90) - Policy
 RAF Northolt (210) - British Forces Post Office
 HMNB Portsmouth and DM Gosport (350) - Fleet Support and Defence Munitions
 Rosyth Dockyard (120) - Fleet Support and Defence Munitions
 RAF Waddington (170) - ISTAR Support
 Yeovil (410) - Helicopter Support

Responsibility for 'Logistics, Commodities and Services' (including storage and delivery of non-weaponry equipment, such as food and clothing, to soldiers) was contracted out to the private sector in 2015 under an arrangement that included the transfer of 1,100 staff and construction of a new 'Defence Fulfilment Centre' at MoD Donnington.

References

Attribution
This article contains text from this source: https://www.gov.uk/government/uploads/system/uploads/attachment_data/file/526950/DES_Corporate_Plan_201619-20160526.pdf. © Crown copyright, which is available under the Open Government Licence v3.0

External links
Defence Equipment Support Home
Defence Equipment Support at Gov.uk
Defence Equipment Support Organisation Structure

Defence agencies of the United Kingdom
 
Military logistics of the United Kingdom
Government agencies established in 2007
Military acquisition
2007 establishments in the United Kingdom